Jean Cluzel (18 November 1923 – 12 September 2020) was a French politician who was renowned in the 1980s for his reports about the audiovisual media. He was born in Moulins, Allier, France in November 1923. Cluzel served as a senator, and was a member of the Académie des sciences morales et politiques.

References 

1923 births
2020 deaths
Politicians from Moulins, Allier
Members of the Académie des sciences morales et politiques
Senators of Allier
Commandeurs of the Légion d'honneur
Commandeurs of the Ordre des Arts et des Lettres